The Committee for Finnish Affairs was a committee in the Grand Duchy of Finland that assisted the Minister-Secretary of State for Finland with various  issues regarding Finland for the years from 1811 to 1826 and then from 1857 to 1891.

Literature
 

Grand Duchy of Finland
19th century in Finland
1857 establishments in the Russian Empire